Megan Helen Compain (born 18 September 1975) is a New Zealand former basketball player who competed in the 2000 Summer Olympics and in the 2004 Summer Olympics.

Biography
She was born 18 September 1975 in Whanganui, New Zealand. As an exchange student she attended Middle Township High School in New Jersey. She competed in the 2000 Summer Olympics and in the 2004 Summer Olympics.

References

1975 births
Living people
New Zealand women's basketball players
Basketball players at the 2000 Summer Olympics
Basketball players at the 2004 Summer Olympics
New Zealand expatriate basketball people in the United States
Olympic basketball players of New Zealand
Saint Joseph's Hawks women's basketball players
Middle Township High School alumni